Daniel Pearl, A.S.C. (born 1951 in The Bronx, New York) is an American cinematographer who has worked on many feature films, over 400 music videos and more than 250 commercials. He is known for his cinematography work on various horror films, including The Texas Chain Saw Massacre (1974) and its 2003 remake, Aliens vs. Predator: Requiem (2007), Friday the 13th (2009), The Boy (2016) and Mom and Dad (2017).

After gaining a master's degree at University of Texas at Austin, Pearl met Tobe Hooper in a film lab. After receiving some advice from the cinematographer about filters, Hooper later invited him to work on The Texas Chain Saw Massacre, saying that "it's really important that I have a Texan shoot this film."

He won the first MTV cinematography award for "Every Breath You Take." He filmed the Michael Bay-directed "I'd Do Anything for Love (But I Won't Do That)", which he cites as "one of my personal all-time favorite projects ... I think the cinematography is pure, and it tells a story about the song." Michael Bay would later produce the 2003 Chainsaw remake.

Filmography

References

External links

Daniel Pearl at MVDBase.com
Interview with International Cinematographers Guild

1951 births
Living people
American cinematographers
People from the Bronx
Moody College of Communication alumni
Date of birth missing (living people)